Events from the year 1507 in Ireland.


Incumbent
Lord: Henry VII

Events
Stephen Lynch fitz Dominick Dubh becomes the 23rd Mayor of Galway

Deaths
 July 12 - Fedlim Mac Giolla Seanáin, a Brehon lawyer and Canon lawyer.
 November 20 – Arthur Lynch, 22nd Mayor of Galway, drowned.

References

 
1500s in Ireland
Ireland
Years of the 16th century in Ireland